Maksym Imerekov (born 23 January 1991) is a Ukrainian football defender who plays for Zorya Luhansk.

Career
Imerekov is a product of youth team system FC Shakhtar Donetsk.

In July 2011 he signed a contract with FC Metalurh of the Ukrainian First League.

Desna Chernihiv 
In 2018 he moved to Desna Chernihiv the main club in Chernihiv in Ukraine. He made his contribution for the play off relegation in the season 2018–19 and contributed to the club to not relegate and the following season he made it into the Quarterfinal of the Ukrainian Cup in the season 2019–20 and for the Qualification for the Play-Off of the Championship round table of the Premier League in the season 2019–20. On 10 April 2021 he scored against Oleksandriya in Ukrainian Premier League at the Chernihiv Stadium ended 4-1 for Desna. On 17 April 2021 he scored against FC Mynai. In May 2021, Imerekov and the club of Desna Chernihiv ended the cooperation.

Honours
Oleksandriya
 Ukrainian First League: 2014–15

References

External links
 From Official the website of FC Desna Chernihiv
 
 
 

1991 births
Living people
Sportspeople from Makiivka
Ukrainian footballers
Association football defenders
Ukraine youth international footballers
Ukraine under-21 international footballers
FC Shakhtar-3 Donetsk players
FC Metalurh Zaporizhzhia players
FC Metalurh-2 Zaporizhzhia players
FC Oleksandriya players
Ukrainian Premier League players
Ukrainian expatriate footballers
Expatriate footballers in Belarus
FC Belshina Bobruisk players
Ukrainian expatriate sportspeople in Belarus
FC Torpedo-BelAZ Zhodino players
Ermis Aradippou FC players
FC Desna Chernihiv players
FC Zorya Luhansk players
Expatriate footballers in Cyprus
Ukrainian expatriate sportspeople in Cyprus